Samuel Gene Maghett (February 14, 1937 – December 1, 1969), known as Magic Sam, was an American Chicago blues musician. He was born in Grenada County, Mississippi, and learned to play the blues from listening to records by Muddy Waters and Little Walter. After moving to Chicago at the age of 19, he was signed by Cobra Records and became well known as a bluesman after the release of his first record, "All Your Love", in 1957. He was known for his distinctive tremolo guitar playing.

The stage name Magic Sam was devised by Sam's bass player and childhood friend Mack Thompson at Sam's first recording session for Cobra, as an approximation of "Maghett Sam". The name Sam was using at the time, Good Rocking Sam, was already being used by another artist.

Life and career
Maghett moved to Chicago in 1956, where his guitar playing earned him bookings at blues clubs on the West Side. He recorded singles for Cobra Records from 1957 to 1959, including "All Your Love" and "Easy Baby". They did not reach the record charts but had a profound influence, far beyond Chicago's guitarists and singers. Together with recordings by Otis Rush and Buddy Guy (also Cobra artists), the West Side Sound was a manifesto for a new kind of blues. Around this time Magic Sam worked briefly with Homesick James Williamson.  Magic Sam gained a following before being drafted into the U.S. Army. He served six months in prison for desertion and received a dishonorable discharge.

In 1963, his single "Feelin' Good (We're Gonna Boogie)" gained national attention. He successfully toured the U.S., Britain and Germany. He was signed to Delmark Records in 1967, for which he recorded West Side Soul and Black Magic. He continued performing live and toured with a band that included blues harp player Charlie Musselwhite, future Commander Cody and His Lost Planet Airmen bassist "Buffalo" Bruce Barlow and drummer Sam Lay. Magic Sam's breakthrough performance was at the Ann Arbor Blues Festival in 1969, which won him many bookings in the U.S. and Europe. He sometimes performed with his uncle, Shakey Jake Harris.

Death
His career was cut short when he suddenly died of a heart attack in December 1969. He was 32 years old. Magic Sam was buried in the Restvale Cemetery, in Alsip, Illinois. He was survived by his wife, Georgia Maghett. In February 1970, the Butterfield Blues Band played at a benefit concert for Magic Sam, at Fillmore West in San Francisco. Also on the bill were Mike Bloomfield, Elvin Bishop, Charlie Musselwhite and Nick Gravenites.

Legacy
His guitar style, vocals, and songwriting have inspired and influenced many blues musicians. "Magic Sam had a different guitar sound," said his record producer, Willie Dixon. "Most of the guys were playing the straight 12-bar blues thing, but the harmonies that he carried with the chords was a different thing altogether. This tune "All Your Love", he expressed with such an inspirational feeling with his high voice. You could always tell him, even from his introduction to the music."

Awards and recognition
 1982, Blues Foundation Blues Music Award for Magic Sam Live in the category Vintage or Reissue Album of the Year (US)
 1982, Blues Foundation Hall of Fame, induction as Performer
 1984, Blues Foundation Hall of Fame, West Side Soul selected in the category Classics of Blues Recordings – Albums
 1990, Blues Foundation Hall of Fame, Black Magic selected in the category Classics of Blues Recordings – Albums

Partial discography
Singles

Albums

References

1937 births
1969 deaths
20th-century American singers
People from Grenada County, Mississippi
Military personnel from Mississippi
Chicago blues musicians
Electric blues musicians
American blues guitarists
American male guitarists
American blues singers
Blues musicians from Mississippi
Delmark Records artists
20th-century American guitarists
Guitarists from Illinois
Guitarists from Mississippi
20th-century American male musicians
Cobra Records artists